Pon farr  is a phenomenon in the Star Trek universe. A part of the reproductive cycle of Vulcans, pon farr features in the canonical television series as well as in various spin-offs and fan fiction. An extreme physical and psychological imbalance every seven years requires a mating ritual or death can ensue.

Description
Every seven years, Vulcan males and females become aroused. If the normally calm and rational Vulcans do not mate with someone with whom they are empathically bonded they eventually enter plak tow, the blood fever, become violent, and finally die unless they mate with someone or engage in a ritual battle known as kal-if-fee.

A common misconception associated with the series (and Spock in particular) is that Vulcans only have sex once every seven years. However, pon farr is not coincident with the sex lives of Vulcans, and they are able to have intercourse without the affliction, and thus more than once every seven years. Star Trek: The Original Series writer and continuity story editor D. C. Fontana explains that pon farr is not the only time that Vulcans feel sexual desire or engage in sexual activity:

Vulcans mate normally any time they want to. However, every seven years you do the ritual, the ceremony, the whole thing. The biological urge. You must, but any other time is any other emotion –humanoid emotion– when you're in love. When you want to, you know when the urge is there, you do it. This every-seven-years business was taken too literally by too many people who don't stop and understand. We didn't mean it only every seven years. I mean, every seven years would be a little bad, and it would not explain the Vulcans of many different ages which are not seven years apart.

Vulcans not only are able to mate outside pon farr, they are also able to mate with species other than Vulcan: e.g., in Star Trek: The Original Series, Spock's parents are human/vulcan couple; in Star Trek: Enterprise, T'Pol, a Vulcan, has a romantic and sexual relationship with Trip, a human; and, in the Star Trek reboot, Spock is in a relationship with Lt. Uhura.

Vulcans consider pon farr to be a deeply private matter, and the mere mention of it to other species is almost taboo. Even discussing pon farr with other Vulcans is discouraged, to the point where physicians (Vulcan or otherwise) would falsify a diagnosis in order to protect their patients' privacy. As such, literature on the subject is virtually nonexistent, in stark contrast to the Vulcans' normally logical and scientifically dispassionate view of any other biological function.

In Star Trek canon
Pon farr was introduced and prominently featured in the original Star Trek series episode "Amok Time", written by Theodore Sturgeon. In the episode, Mr. Spock experiences pon farr and is returned to his home planet Vulcan by Captain Kirk and Dr. McCoy to undergo the mating ritual and save his life.

Additionally, Spock experienced an accelerated version of pon farr due to the Genesis planet's influence in Star Trek III: The Search for Spock, as a young man. He was aided by fellow half-Vulcan, Saavik.

In the Voyager episode "Blood Fever" Vulcan Ensign Vorik experiences pon farr and attempts to mate with B'Elanna Torres. Due to a partial empathic bond, Torres experiences pon farr as well.  Vorik attempts to control the pon farr through meditation, drugs and a holodeck mate, while Torres, trapped on an away mission, nearly mates with Tom Paris. The pon farr is eventually resolved when Torres and Vorik battle together in the ritual fight kun-ut kal-if-fee on the planet.

Also on Voyager, in the episode "Body and Soul", Tuvok experienced pon farr while the vessel was trapped far away from any other Vulcans, and so was unable to mate with his wife. Initially he claimed that he had Tarkalean flu to the crew to spare the embarrassment of discussing his actual condition. He attempted to control the pon farr through meditation and drugs, but he was ultimately not successful. Finally, Tom Paris, whose hobby is creating holographic novels, creates a holodeck program with a reproduction of his wife, which while it proves to be a sufficient kludge, for Tuvok it is "no substitute for my wife".

While originally described as an experience restricted to male Vulcans, the character T'Pol underwent pon farr as a result of an exposure to alien bacteria in the episode "Bounty" from the Star Trek series Enterprise.

In other media

 In The Simpsons 1999 episode "They Saved Lisa's Brain", Comic Book Guy, representing an intellectual junta that briefly ran the town, proposes pon farr to limit breeding to once every seven years, commenting that this would mean much less breeding for most, but for him, "much, much more".
 The 2000 Futurama episode "Why Must I Be a Crustacean in Love?" closely parodies pon farr, with the character Dr. Zoidberg returning to his home planet Decapod 10 for his species' mating ritual. In an ironic twist, Zoidberg's life would end if he mated.
 In the January 11–13, 2011 strips of Dilbert, Dilbert is diagnosed with pon farr, causing an irresistible urge to mate.

References

External links 

Fictional activities
Vulcans
Star Trek terminology
Sexuality in science fiction